Lida Chan (born 25 March 1980) is a Cambodian filmmaker.

Career 

Lida Chan joined Bophana Center in 2006, where, as an archivist, she specializes in the analysis of Khmer Rouge archives. She also works as a radio journalist for Radio France Internationale, where she covered the trial of former Khmer Rouge cadre Duch.

In 2010, Lida Chan turned into documentary filmmaking after being trained by Cambodian filmmaker and producer Rithy Panh.

Filmography

References 

1980 births
Living people
Cambodian film directors
Cambodian radio journalists
Cambodian women film directors
Cambodian documentary film directors
21st-century Cambodian women
Women documentary filmmakers
Women radio journalists